Castleman is a surname. Notable people with this name include:

A. Welford Castleman Jr., American scientist
Benjamin Castleman (born 1906), American pathologist best known for Castleman's disease
Boomer Castleman, American singer-songwriter and guitarist from Farmers Branch, Texas
Charles Castleman American violinist and teacher b. Quincy, Mass
Charles Castleman (solicitor), British solicitor
Foster Castleman (born 1931), former professional baseball player
Frank Castleman (1877–1946), American football and baseball player, track athlete, and coach in multiple sports
John Breckinridge Castleman (1841–1918), brigadier general and prominent landowner and businessman in Louisville, Kentucky
Ken Castleman, president of Advanced Digital Imaging Research and author of the canonical textbook Digital Image Processing
Myron Castleman, main character in 12:01 PM
Robert Lee Castleman, American country singer and songwriter
Slick Castleman (1913–1998), pitcher in Major League Baseball

See also
Castleman Run Lake Wildlife Management Area, near Bethany, West Virginia, USA
Castleman Trailway, footpath in Southern England
Castleman's disease, uncommon lymphoproliferative disorder that can involve single lymph node stations or can be systemic
John B. Castleman Monument, within the Cherokee Triangle of Louisville, Kentucky, USA
United States v. Castleman, a 2014 US Supreme Court decision about whether persons convicted of domestic violence misdemeanors may be barred from gun ownership